The Ostracon of Prince Sethherkhepshef is a painted limestone figured-ostracon of the son of Ramesses III (reigned 1186–1155 BCE). It is a standing, figured profile of Prince Sethherkhepshef (who later ascended the throne as Ramesses VIII) in an adoration pose, with outstretched arms, a sceptre in his left hand, and right hand, palm-forward. Behind Sethherkhepshef in a standard layout of figures and writing, is a vertical column of hieroglyphs reading "king's son of his body, his beloved" with his name (Seth-her-kepesh) appearing at the end.

The ostracon was found in the Valley of the Queens, where a tomb (QV43) was built for the prince. It is currently in the Museo Egizio, Turin, Italy.

Egyptian ostraca were used for artist's sketchings, cartoons-caricatures, letter documents, school–practice writing, and graffiti. This particular ostracon may be a sketch by an artisan working on the prince's tomb.

References
Johnson, Paul. The Civilization of Ancient Egypt. HarperCollins. 1999. P. 165: "Ostracon...business record of Prince Sethinkhopsef". (hardcover)

External links
 Ostracon of Prince Sethherkhepshef
 Ostracon of Sethherkhepeshef

12th-century BC inscriptions
Ostracon
Museo Egizio
Valley of the Queens
Twentieth Dynasty of Egypt